Alexander Posada (born March 6, 1977) is a former Colombian footballer who played the majority of his career in the Colombian football leagues, and had stints in Ecuadorian Serie A, and the Canadian Professional Soccer League.

Playing career 
Posada began his career in Colombia with Deportivo Pereira in the Categoría Primera B in 1993. In 1997, he was transferred to Deportes Quindío, and after one season with Quinio he signed with América de Cali of the Categoría Primera A. During his tenure with America he won the Colombian League twice in 2000, 2001, and the Copa Merconorte. In 2001, he signed with Cortuluá, and featured in the club`s run in the Copa Libertadores. In 2002, he returned to his former club Deportivo Pereira, and had a stint with Millonarios F.C., where the team finished second in the overall standings. In 2004, he went abroad to sign with Deportivo Quito of the Ecuadorian Serie A.

On April 24, 2006, Posada signed with Toronto Supra Portuguese of the Canadian Soccer League. He made his debut for Toronto in a friendly match against S.C. Braga on May 12, 2006. He recorded his first goal for the club on July 16, 2006 in a 2-2 draw with London City Soccer Club. He helped Toronto secure a postseason berth by finishing fourth in the International Division. The club's opponents in the playoffs were the Serbian White Eagles, but they were eliminated by a score of 3-0.

International career 
Posada played for the Colombia national football team from 1999 till 2002, and featured in five matches.

References 

1977 births
Living people
Colombia international footballers
Colombian footballers
Colombian expatriate footballers
Categoría Primera A players
Categoría Primera B players
Ecuadorian Serie A players
América de Cali footballers
Cortuluá footballers
Deportes Quindío footballers
Deportivo Pereira footballers
S.D. Quito footballers
Canadian Soccer League (1998–present) players
Millonarios F.C. players
SC Toronto players
Expatriate footballers in Ecuador
Expatriate soccer players in Canada
Association football defenders